Ják is a village in Vas County, on the western boundary of Hungary.

Church of Saint George 

The parish church of Ják is the most complete Romanesque Church in Hungary. It was originally built as the church of a Benedictine monastery. The village church at that time was a rotunda in front of the façade of the main doorway of  Ják church.

Both outside and inside the church is adorned with rich sculptures. The 3 naves and 3 apses are formed in a basilica structure. Columnar capitals are sculptured by plant and some animal ornamentation.

The rotunda has been built with 4 apses and 2 floors.

Photo gallery

Notable people
 Dezső Novák (1939 – 2014), Hungarian footballer

References
 Aradi N. (Ed.): A művészet története Magyarországon. (The History of Arts in Hungary). Gondolat, Budapest 
 Fülep L. (Ed.): A magyarországi művészet története. (The History of the Hungarian Arts). Budapest 
 Gerevich T.: Magyarország románkori emlékei. (Die romanische Denkmäler Ungarns.) Egyetemi nyomda. Budapest, 1938.
 Gerő L. : Magyar műemléki ABC. Budapest, 1984
 Gervers-Molnár, V. (1972): A középkori Magyarország rotundái. (Rotunda in the Medieval Hungary). Akadémiai, Budapest
 Henszlmann, I. (1876): Magyarország ó-keresztyén, román és átmeneti stylü mű-emlékeinek rövid ismertetése, (Old-Christian, Romanesque and Transitional Style Architecture in Hungary). Királyi Magyar Egyetemi Nyomda, Budapest
 Marosi E.: A román kor művészete, (Art of the Romanesque Ages). Corvina, Budapest, 1972,

External links 

 Street map 
 Aerial photographs of Ják

Populated places in Vas County
Romanesque architecture in Hungary